Jayne Marie McHugh (born May 31, 1960) is a former volleyball player. She played for the United States national team at the 1988 Summer Olympics.

References

1960 births
Living people
Olympic volleyball players of the United States
Volleyball players at the 1988 Summer Olympics
American women's volleyball players
21st-century American women
Pacific Tigers women's volleyball players
Pan American Games medalists in volleyball
Pan American Games bronze medalists for the United States
Medalists at the 1987 Pan American Games